The Egyptian tomb bat (Taphozous perforatus) is a species of sac-winged bat in the family Emballonuridae. It is an aerial insectivore, foraging in open space. Based on individuals captured in Ethiopia, it is thought to feed predominantly on Lepidoptera, but is also known to feed on Isoptera, Coleoptera and Orthoptera.

Description

Subspecies
Mammals of Africa follows Mammal Species of the World in recognizing four subspecies.

 T. p. senegalensis  — West Africa
 T. p. perforatus  — Egypt and northern Sudan
 T. p. sudani  — Southern Sudan, South Sudan, eastern Democratic Republic of the Congo, Botswana, and Zimbabwe
 T. p. haedinus  — Tanzania through Ethiopia and in South Asia.

Biology

Diet
An analysis of the bat's feces done by J. Rydell and D. W. Yalden in 1997 in Ethiopia deduced its diet is mostly moths (57%). Other prey includes: termites (14%), beetles (10%), katydids and crickets (8%), bugs (3%), lacewings (2%), ants (1%), and flies (1%).

Reproduction
Juvenile bats (pups) and lactating females have been encountered in July.
Parturition, or giving birth, likely occurs in late May and early June.
They are polyestrous, capable of becoming pregnant multiple times a year.
Pregnancies can occur in quick succession, with one female identified that was simultaneously lactating and pregnant.

Parasites
Michel Anciaux de Faveaux reports the following fleas, bat-flies, ticks, and mites have been found as ectoparasites on this species:

Siphonaptera: Pulicidae
 Xenopsylla cheopis
Siphonaptera: Ischnopsyllidae
 Araeopsylla wassifi
 Chiropteropsylla aegyptia
 Chiropteropsylla brockmani
Diptera: Nycteribiidae
 Phthiridium integrum
Diptera: Streblidae
 Brachytarsina diversa
 Brachytarsina alluaudi
Acari: Argasida
 Carios vespertilionis
 Carios boueti
 Carios confusus
 Alectorobius salahi
Acari: Macronyssidae
 Steatonyssus sp.
Acari: Myobiidae
 Ugandobia barnleyi
Acari: Chirodiscidae
 Alabidocarpus taphozous

Genetics
Based on a study of Egyptian specimens, A. E. Yaseen and colleagues report its chromosome number is 2n = 42 and its autosomal fundamental number is 64.

Reservoir of MERS-CoV 
An isolate of the MERS-CoV from the first patient identified was found in an Egyptian tomb bat near the victim's home in Saudi Arabia. The isolate, found in a fecal pellet from the bat, was found to be a 100% match with the London victim.

Range and habitat 
Its type locality is Kom Ombo, Egypt. Geoffroy's initial description was based on specimens from Kon Ombo and Thebes but he didn't specify which was the type location; D. Kock designated Kom Ombo the type locality in 1969.
It is found in Benin, Botswana, Burkina Faso, Democratic Republic of the Congo, Djibouti, Egypt, Ethiopia, Gambia, Ghana, Guinea-Bissau, India, Iran, Kenya, Mali, Mauritania, Niger, Nigeria, Pakistan, Saudi Arabia, Senegal, Somalia, Sudan, Tanzania, Uganda, and Zimbabwe.
Its natural habitat is dry savanna.
In South Asia, it prefers tropical thorn forests.
It avoids deserts and forests.
It is not found at elevations above .

Conservation
It is currently assessed as least concern by the IUCN.
It meets the criteria for this listing because it has a large population, a wide distribution, and its population trend is currently stable.
A threat facing the populations in South Asia is destruction of the thorn forests.
Thorn forests are currently being destroyed for agriculture, mining, and stone quarries.

References

Further reading

 
 
 
 
 

Mammals of Pakistan
Taphozous
Mammals described in 1818
Taxa named by Étienne Geoffroy Saint-Hilaire
Bats of Africa
Taxonomy articles created by Polbot